This is a list of all tornadoes that were confirmed by local offices of the National Weather Service in the United States from July to August 2011.

United States yearly total

July

July 1 event

July 2 event

July 4 event

July 5 event

July 6 event

July 7 event

July 8 event

July 10 event

July 11 event

July 12 event

July 13 event

July 14 event

July 15 event

July 16 event

July 17 event

July 18 event

July 19 event

July 20 event

July 22 event

July 23 event

July 24 event

July 26 event

July 27 event

July 29 event

July 30 event

August

August 2 event

August 3 event

August 5 event

August 6 event

August 7 event

August 8 event

August 9 event

August 10 event

August 11 event

August 14 event

August 18 event

August 19 event

August 20 event

August 21 event

August 23 event

August 24 event

August 25 event

August 26 event
The events in North Carolina were related to Hurricane Irene.

August 27 event
The events in Delaware and Virginia were related to Hurricane Irene.

August 28 event
The events in New Jersey and New York were related to Hurricane Irene.

August 29 event

See also
 Tornadoes of 2011

Notes

References

United States,07
Tornadoes,2011,07
2011,07
Tornadoes
Tornadoes